Tauqeer Raza Khan  is an Indian politician and Islamic cleric from the state of Uttar Pradesh. He is a religious leader of the Bareilvi sect of Sunni Muslims and the founder of the political party Ittehad-e-Millat Council. He is a greatgrandson of Ahmed Raza Khan, who was the founder of the Barelvi movement. He also heads the All India Muslim Personal Law Board (Jaded) after he cut ties with the All India Muslim Personal Law Board, claiming discrimination by the Deobandi Muslims.

Raza Khan was elevated to the post of the Vice Chairman of his state's handloom department but resigned following the Muzaffar nagar riots. In 2016 he visited Deoband, which is the home of a rival Deobandi sub sect, in an attempt to forge unity among Muslims. For this he was criticised by clerics from his own sect and apologised after being found guilty of commuting sin by a panel of religious clerics.

Personal life 
Raza Khan is the great-grandson of Ahmed Raza Khan, the founder of the Barelvi movement. His elder brother, Subhan Raza Khan, is the chairman of the governing body of Dargah-e-Aala Hazrat, the shrine of Ahmed Raza Khan.

Career

Political career 
On 7 October 2001 Raza Khan formed his own political party, the Ittehad-e-Millat Council. In the first municipal election the party contested, it won 10 seats. The mayoral candidate of the party secured 36,000 votes.

In the 2009 Indian general election, Raza Khan supported the Indian National Congress party. With his support a Congress candidatePraveen Singh Aronwas able defeat the Bharatiya Janata Party candidate and a six-time member of parliament Santosh Gangwar. In the 2012 Uttar Pradesh Assembly election, he pledged his support for the Samajwadi Party, and in the 2014 Indian general election, he supported the Bahujan Samaj Party.

In the 2012 election Raza Khan urged voters to vote in the name of religion for the minority community. The party made Shazil Islam Ansari, a former Bahujan Samaj Party minister, the candidate from Bhojipura constituency, which was home to 125,000 Muslims. Though he won from the constituency, he joined the Samajwadi Party.

In May 2013 Raza Khan was appointed as the vice chairman of the Handloom Corporation on the condition that the Samajwadi Party would reconsider their candidates fielded in Moradabad and Bareilly for the 2014 Indian general election. He also demanded that a committee be created to investigate the causes of the communal riots that took place in the state during the tenure of chief minister Akhilesh Yadav. He also made clear that his party had not merged with the Samajwadi Party. However, in September 2014 he resigned from his post following the Muzaffarnagar riots. He accused the Samajwadi-led government of failing to protect Muslim citizens. He also alleged that his demand of an investigation into the communal riots had not been fulfilled. He also said:
In November 2013, Raza Khan was visited by Delhi chief minister Arvind Kejriwal, who said that the man next to him was a "respectable person in the town". Kejriwal also refused to accept that by virtue of this meeting he was appeasing the Muslims. Raza Khan said that he liked Kejriwal for his India Against Corruption movement.

Religious career 
The All India Muslim Personal Law Board is a non-governmental organization for personal laws of the Muslims in India. Alleging discrimination, the Shia Muslims formed a parallel All India Shia Personal Law Board. In February 2005 Raza Khan formed his own All India Muslim Personal Law Board (Jaded) ("Modern") for the Barelvi Muslims after alleging discrimination from the Deobandi members of the Law Board. He said:

In May 2016 Raza Khan visited Deoband, the city from which a rival sect Deobandi originated, to meet the family of a boy who had been arrested on accusations of being involved in terrorism. He also visited the Darul Uloom Deoband seminary and spoke to Deobandi religious scholars. The Milli Gazette wrote that it was a move towards unity among Muslims. He said that though the Deobandis and Barelvis differed on theological issues, they should remain united while facing issues affecting the Islamic community. He also said that there was a need to fight the "common enemy". The Times of India wrote that the clerics from the rival sects had met, noting that it was a rare event for a cleric to visit the other's seminary.

The Times of India wrote that Raza Khan's visit to Deoband "stirred a sectarian storm" among the religious scholars of the Barelvi sect. His brother, Subhan Raza Khan, warned that he would face a boycott if he failed to apologise publicly. He said that he would do the same only if a fatwa (Islamic religious opinion) was issued by a mufti (an Islamic scholar who has the authority to interpret Islamic laws) condemning his visit. A panel of 12 muftis was formed by the officials of the Dargah-e-Ala Hazrat who were given the responsibility to investigate the discussion that took place between Raza Khan and the Deobandi scholars based on media files uploaded on social media. Raza Khan was tried in a court held at the Dargah-e-Ala Hazrat. The panel of muftis found him guilty of doing an act of haram (religious sin). He consequently performed a tauba (repenting before God).

Views

Sufi conference
In March 2016 an International Sufi Conference was held in Delhi which was inaugurated by Prime Minister Narendra Modi. Raza Khan criticised the event, claiming that Rashtriya Swayamsevak Sangh (a Hindu right-wing organization) was creating sectarian conflict among the Muslims with this conference. He also said:

Controversies 
Raza Khan became controversial when he spoke about Taslima Nasrin, a Bangladeshi anti-Islamic author. In 2007 Raza Khan had announced a reward of Rs5lakh on the author's head if the Indian government did not restrict her entry to India. According to a report, Maulana had said, "the only way a fatwa against Taslima Nasreen, whose writings clerics denounced as anti-Islam, could be withdrawn was if she burnt her books and left India."

In 2010 Raza Khan was arrested in connection to a riot between Hindus and Muslims that broke out in the city of Bareilly. While the Muslims demanded his release, the Hindus protested against it. In a joint statement, the Muslim Students Organisation and the Barkati Educational Trust said that he was arrested on the basis of a fake complaint and claimed that, if he was not released, the city might not return to normalcy. Even though he was released, Outlook India wrote that it had led to polarisation among Hindus and Muslims on religious lines.

In a program for religious unity held in Bareilly, Raza Khan claimed that Hindu women had five husbands and that they did not know who the father of their children was. He also warned that Muslims would interfere in the matters of Hindus if the Hindus interfered in the matters of Muslims. He made these comments in response to the debate of implementing a uniform civil code in the country and banning the Islamic instant divorce.

References

External links 

Tauqeer
Barelvis
People from Bareilly
Living people
Indian people of Pashtun descent
Year of birth missing (living people)